Dead Again (stylized as DЭДD ДGДIИ) is the seventh and final studio album by the American gothic metal band Type O Negative, released before the death of frontman Peter Steele in 2010, and subsequent dissolution of the band. It was released on March 13, 2007, through record label Steamhammer, a subsidiary of SPV.

Recording 

The band uses studio drums instead of a drum machine for the first time since their third album, Bloody Kisses. Thus, it remains the only Type O Negative studio album with Johnny Kelly's actual playing, as he was only "credited" as the drummer on the three albums prior to Dead Again.

Content 

The cover photo is a portrayal of Grigori Rasputin, the Russian mystic and associate of Tsar Nicholas II. The lettering is in a faux-Cyrillic font.

The song "Halloween in Heaven" is a tribute to Dimebag Darrell, who was killed in 2004.

Release 
{{Album ratings
| rev1 = AllMusic
| rev1score = 
| rev2 = Blabbermouth.net
| rev2score = 8/10
| rev3 = Chronicles of Chaos
| rev3score = 9/10<ref>{{cite web |url=http://www.chroniclesofchaos.com/articles.aspx?id=2-4536 |title=CoC : Type O Negative – Dead Again : Review |last=Smit |first=Jackie |date=March 8, 2007 |website=Chronicles of Chaos |accessdate=July 18, 2020}}</ref>
| rev4 = MetalSucks
| rev4score = 4/5
| rev5 = NME| rev5Score = ambiguous
}}

Reception for Dead Again was mainly positive, and resulted in the band's highest ever chart positions. In the US, it debuted at No. 27 on the Billboard 200, selling 22,000 copies, only slightly less than Life is Killing Me.

The insert of the CD folds out into the shape of a cross with Rasputin's head at the top. The media tray has the words "Снова Мертвый" ("Dead Again") visible underneath along with Rasputin's autopsy information. The photograph on the back was taken in 1906, showing four young women of the Tsarist family, identified left to right as Grand Duchesses Olga, Tatiana, Maria and Anastasia Nikolaevna.

The bonus tracks were taken from the Symphony for the Devil live DVD. The album was re-released in February 2008, with a DVD including live performances, interviews, and music videos. A separate three-LP vinyl box set was also released that included several collectors' items, such as a T-shirt, a 12-page booklet, and a DVD disc that contains the same live footage and music videos as the Best Buy exclusive DVD, an interview, and the entire album in MP3 format. Two of the vinyl discs are red and one is the standard black. The box itself comes in the red version of the cover art.

Since it was released under a different label, Dead Again is the only studio album to not be included in many of the band's compilation releases including 2013's The Complete Roadrunner Collection 1991 - 2003 and 2019's None More Negative boxset. And with Steamhammer's parent company SPV GmbH declaring bankrupt in 2009, many of the artists that had signed to the label were not able to rerelease their albums due to legal issues, including Dead Again.'' On August 20, 2021, the album was made available once again on Spotify and Apple Music through Nuclear Blast. 

On March 13, 2022 (the 15th anniversary of the album's release), it was announced through social media that Dead Again would receive a reissue on vinyl, CD, and cassette.

Track listing

Personnel
Type O Negative
 Peter Steele – lead vocals, bass guitar, arrangements, production
 Kenny Hickey – backing vocals, co-lead vocals (on "The Profit Of Doom", “September Sun”, "Halloween in Heaven", "These Three Things", "Some Stupid Tomorrow" and "An Ode to Locksmiths"), electric guitar, arrangements
 Josh Silver – backing vocals, keyboards, synthesizers, sound effects, arrangements, production, recording, mixing, engineering, mastering
 Johnny Kelly – drums, percussion, arrangements

Additional personnel
 The Bensonhoist Lesbian Choir (actually the band members themselves) – backing vocals
 Tara VanFlower – backing vocals (on "Halloween in Heaven")
 Paul Bento – electronic programming and tamboura (on "The Profit of Doom")

Technical personnel
 Mike Marciano – mastering
 Paul Bento – engineering (on additional recordings)

Charts

References

External links
 
 Type O Negative Remember Dimebag Darrell On 'Positive' New LP March 2007
 Decibel Magazine Interview March 2007
 17 Years of Type O Negative March 2007
 Interview: Josh Silver March 2007

Type O Negative albums
2007 albums
SPV/Steamhammer albums